Frederick Charles Darwent (20 April 1927 – 15 January 2020) was bishop of Aberdeen and Orkney, from 1976 to 1991.

Biography 
Born in Liverpool, Darwent was educated at Ormskirk Grammar School. After military service in the Far East with the Royal Inniskilling Fusiliers he was ordained Deacon in  1961; and Priest in  1963. He was a Curate in Wigan then held incumbencies in Strichen, New Pitsligo and Fraserburgh. He was made a Canon of St Andrew's Cathedral, Aberdeen in  1971; and was Dean of Aberdeen and Orkney from 1973 to 1978. He was also a JP in Aberdeen from 1989 to 1996. He died in January 2020 at the age of 92.

References

1927 births
2020 deaths
Bishops of Aberdeen and Orkney
Deans of Aberdeen and Orkney
Royal Inniskilling Fusiliers officers
People educated at Ormskirk Grammar School